Paracoryphella is a genus of sea slugs, specifically aeolid nudibranchs, marine gastropod molluscs in the family Paracoryphellidae.

Species 
Species within the genus Paracoryphella are as follows:
 Paracoryphella ignicrystalla Korshunova, Martynov, Bakken, Evertsen, Fletcher, Mudianta, Saito, Lundin, Schrödl & Picton, 2017
 Paracoryphella islandica (Odhner, 1937)
 Paracoryphella parva (Hadfield, 1963)

References

Paracoryphellidae